Zachariah Mudge is the name of:

 Zachary Mudge (1770–1852), also referred to as Zachariah, British navy officer, participated in the historic Vancouver Expedition
 Zachariah Mudge (priest) (1694–1769), British theologian, painted by Joshua Reynolds
 Zachariah A. Mudge (1813–1888), Methodist pastor in Massachusetts and the author of a biography of Abraham Lincoln